The 64th Mobil 1 12 Hours of Sebring Fueled by Fresh from Florida was an endurance sports car racing event held at Sebring International Raceway near Sebring, Florida from 16 to 19 March 2016. The race was the second round of the 2016 WeatherTech SportsCar Championship, as well as the second round of the North American Endurance Cup. It was the final time that the original Daytona Prototypes participated in the race, as, for 2017, they were replaced with the new DPi cars.

The race was won by Tequila Patrón ESM's Ligier JS P2 driven by Scott Sharp, Johannes van Overbeek, Ed Brown, and Pipo Derani after completing a pass for the lead in the final moments of the race. The Prototype Challenge class was won by the No. 54 CORE Autosport entry driven by Colin Braun, Mark Wilkins, and Jon Bennett. GT Le Mans was won by the No. 4 Chevrolet Corvette C7.R from Corvette Racing, driven by Oliver Gavin, Tommy Milner, and Marcel Fässler. The GT Daytona class was won by the No. 63 Ferrari 488 GT3 from Scuderia Corsa, driven by Christina Nielsen, Alessandro Balzan, and Jeff Segal. The race saw a stoppage of roughly two hours and 15 minutes due to heavy rain and lightning just before the halfway-point of the event.

Race

Results
Class winners are denoted in bold.

References

12 Hours of Sebring
12 Hours of Sebring
12 Hours of Sebring
12 Hours of Sebring
12 Hours of Sebring